Dorello's canal is a bow-shaped bony enclosure at the tip of the temporal bone. It contains the abducens nerve (CN VI), inferior petrosal sinus, and the dorsal meningeal artery (a branch of the meningohypophyseal trunk).

Structure 
Dorello's canal is a bow-shaped bony enclosure at the tip of the petrous part of the temporal bone. It is fairly short. Dura mater forms a sleeve within Dorello's canal, forming an outer wall. There may also be arachnoid mater. This contains the abducens nerve (VI) and the inferior petrosal sinus.

The petrosphenoidal ligament (Gruber's ligament, or petroclinoidal ligament) forms the roof of Dorello's canal.

Function 
Dorello's canal allows for passage of the abducens nerve (CN VI) and the inferior petrosal sinus as they travel to merge with the cavernous sinus.

Clinical significance 
Dorello's canal can entrap the abducens nerve (CN VI) after cranial trauma.

History 
Dorello's canal is named after the Italian anatomist Primo Dorello, who proved the existence of this canal after a series of dissections. Gruber's ligament, which forms part of Dorello's canal, is named after the anatomist Wenzel Leopold Gruber.

See also 
 Sixth nerve palsy

References

External links 
 Dorello's canal: a microanatomical study

Human anatomy
Anatomy named for one who described it